Carlos Sieburger (27 December 1921 – 1996) was an Argentine sailor. He competed in the 5.5 Metre event at the 1960 Summer Olympics.

References

External links
 

1921 births
1996 deaths
Argentine male sailors (sport)
Olympic sailors of Argentina
Sailors at the 1960 Summer Olympics – 5.5 Metre
Sportspeople from Buenos Aires